Sangeeta Sudhakara Balakrushna Dash was a veteran Guru of Odissi music. One of the chief disciples of the legend Pt Gokul Chandra Srichandan of Kendrapada, Dash worked variously as a vocalist, composer and music director. He received the Odisha Sangeet Natak Akademi award in 1975-76 for Odissi Vocal. He was an Odissi classical music teacher in the GKCM Odissi Research Centre.

Balakrushna Dash started his music career as a singer of Odissi classical music (Odissi, Chhanda, Champu and other facets) at AIR, Calcutta in the year 1944. Later he started working as music director in films. His first film as a music director was Kedar Gouri in 1954. He directed music in 20 films and hundreds of non-film albums including Odissi, Drama, Theatre and music programs for the AIR, Cuttack.

Among his illustrious disciples are Shyamamani Devi and Ramhari Das.

See also 

 Odissi music
 Mardala
 Gita Govinda
 Gitaprakasa

References 

Indian male singers
Music directors
Odissi
People from Odisha
Odissi music
Recipients of the Sangeet Natak Akademi Award
Recipients of the Odisha Sangeet Natak Akademi award
Disciples of Singhari Shyamsundar Kar